2014 China Open may refer to:

 2014 China Open (snooker), a snooker tournament
 2014 China Open (tennis), a tennis tournament
 2014 China Open Super Series Premier, an edition of the China Open badminton tournament

See also 

 Men's China Squash Open 2014
 Women's China Squash Open 2014